The American College of the Immaculate Conception, or the American College of Louvain is a former Roman Catholic seminary in Leuven, Belgium.  Founded in 1857, it was operated by United States Conference of Catholic Bishops (USCCB) to prepare European priests for service in the United States and to provide a residence for Americans priests studying at the Catholic University of Louvain.

The American College closed in June 2011 due to low enrollment and a faculty shortage; its building was turned over to the Katholieke Universiteit Leuven (KU Leuven) for student housing.

History

19th century 
The American College was founded in 1857 by American bishops under the leadership of Bishop Martin J. Spalding of Archdiocese of Louisville and Bishop Peter Paul Lefevere of Archdiocese of Detroit. It was created to train young European men to serve as missionary priests in North America and to give American seminarians the opportunity to study at the Catholic University of Louvain.  The college's signature song was a Marian hymn, O Sodales, authored by Gustave Limpens in 1862.

The College grew rapidly in its early years, most notably under the rectorship of John De Neve, its second rector. Over 800 priests trained at the American College served in dioceses and vicariates during the second half of the 19th century across the United States. Some of the priests were eventually appointed as bishops of newly formed dioceses:

 Bishop Charles John Seghers, foundee of the Alaska mission
 Bishop Patrick Riordan of the Archdiocese of San Francisco 
 Bishop Alphonse Glorieux of the Diocese of Boise
 Bishop John Baptist Brondel of the Diocese of Helena

20th century 
The college continued to train young men for service to the Church in the United States into the twentieth century under the rectorship of Jules De Becker. it remained open during German occupation in First World War.  The college staff hid many documents and other valuable items of Leuven, including the statue of the Sedes Sapientiae, The staff converted the college into an emergency hospital and dispensary of food and clothing.  At its peak, the college was assisting 1,500 Leuven residents per day. 

With the declaration of war in 1939, the college closed. It reopened in 1952 under the rectorship of Father Thomas Maloney.  The college expanded to accommodate the increased number of American priests and brothers wanting to study at the Catholic University.  It also began offering sabbatical opportunities for priests, religious, and lay ecclesial ministers from all nations.

In 1998, a major ethnic dispute known as the Leuven crisis erupted in Belgium between the Flemish-speaking population and the Walloons (French speakers).  To resolve the dispute, the Catholic University of Louvain was split into KU Leuven in Leuven and the Université catholique de Louvain (UCLouvain) in Louvain-la-Neuve, Belgium.  The American College, remaining in Leuven, maintained ties with both new institutions.

Sponsorship and governorship 
The American College was sponsored and overseen by American Catholic bishops through the USCCB.  The other American-sponsored college in Europe was the Pontifical North American College in Rome.   

 The college was overseen by the Committee for the American College, its board of directors. Fourteen American bishops sat on the committee; the last committee chair was Bishop David Ricken of the Diocese of Green Bay. The college also had an advisory board of lay persons and clergy.

At the close of the 2010–2011 academic year, there were nineteen seminarians in formation with the college. Their sponsoring dioceses were: Boise, Cheyenne, Congregation of Holy Cross, Green Bay, Lublin, Madison, Milwaukee, Orange, Portland (Oregon), Rochester, Salford, and Spokane.

Mission 
The primary mission of the American College was the formation of priests who would serve the Catholic Church in North America. In addition to the classes offered by KU Leuven the College provided a comprehensive program of human, spiritual, intellectual, and pastoral formation for seminarians.

The college also hosted graduate students studying canon law and theology in Leuven. The college ran a semester-long sabbatical program for priests, religious, or laity sent by their dioceses or religious congregations. Both the graduate students and sabbaticals took classes through KU Leuven while living at and participating in activities at the college.

Closure 
On November 22, 2010, the USCCB released a statement:"Due to the small number of seminarians and available priest faculty, the American College of the Immaculate Conception in Leuven, Belgium, has announced its closure in June 2011." On August 19, 2011, the USCCB, the American College board, KU Leuven and UCLouvain signed an agreement on the future use of the  American College property. The facility was renovated in 2013 to serve as housing for Mater Dei and the St. Damien Community students, and for American researchers studying philosophy, theology and canon law at KU Leuven and UCLouvain.

Rectors 

 Peter Kindekens, Archdiocese of Detroit, 1857-1860
 John De Neve, Archdiocese of Detroit, 1860-1891
 John Willemsen, Archdiocese of Mechelen, 1891-1898
 Jules De Becker, Archdiocese of Mechelen, 1898-1931
 Pierre de Strycker, Archdiocese of Mechelen, 1931-1939
 Thomas Francis Maloney, Diocese of Providence, 1952-1960
 Paul D. Riedl, Diocese of Springfield, 1960-1970
 Clement E. Pribil, Archdiocese of Oklahoma City, 1970-1971
 Raymond Francis Collins, Diocese of Providence, 1971-1978
 William J. Greytak, Diocese of Helena, 1978-1983
 John J. Costanzo, Diocese of Pueblo, 1983-1988
 Thomas P. Ivory, Archdiocese of Newark, 1988-1992
 Melvin T. Long, Diocese of Salina, 1992-1993
 David E. Windsor, Congregation of the Mission, 1993-2001
 Kevin A. Codd, Diocese of Spokane, 2001-2007
 Ross A. Shecterle, Archdiocese of Milwaukee, 2007-2011

Episcopal alumni 
Over the years, a number of graduates of the American College have been appointed to the episcopacy. Bishop-alumni of the college include:
 Matthew Francis Brady (1893-1959), Bishop of Burlington (1938-1944) and Bishop of Manchester (1944-1959)
 Edward Kenneth Braxton (°1944), Auxiliary Bishop of St. Louis (1995-2001), Bishop of Lake Charles (2001-2005), and Bishop of Belleville (2005-2020)
 Jean-Baptiste Brondel (1842-1903), Bishop of Vancouver Island (1879-1883) and Bishop of Helena (1884-1903)
 Ferdinand Brossart (1849-1930), Bishop of Covington (1915-1923)
 Charles Albert Buswell (1913-2008), Bishop of Pueblo (1959-1979)
 Alphonse Liguori Chaupa (1959-2016), Auxiliary Bishop of Rabaul (2000-2003) and Bishop of Kimbe, Papua New Guinea (2003-2008)
 Francis Joseph Christian (°1942), Auxiliary Bishop of Manchester (1996–2018)
 Edmund Michael Dunne (1864-1929), Bishop of Peoria (1909-1929)
 Shelton Joseph Fabre (°1963), Auxiliary Bishop of New Orleans (2006-2013), Bishop of Houma-Thibodaux (2013–2022) and Archbishop of Louisville (2022- Present)
 Joseph John Fox (1855-1915), Bishop of Green Bay (1904-1915)
 Alphonse Joseph Glorieux (1844-1917), Vicar Apostolic of Idaho (1884-1893) and Bishop of Boise (1893-1917) 
 Charles Pasquale Greco (1894-1987), Bishop of Alexandria (1946-1973)
 Francis Janssens (1843-1897), Bishop of Natchez (1881-1888) and Archbishop of New Orleans (1888-1897)
 Egidius Junger (1833-1895), Bishop of Nesqually (1879-1895)
 Jean-Nicolas Lemmens (1850-1897), Bishop of Victoria (1888-1897)
 Stephen Aloysius Leven (1905-1983), Auxiliary Bishop of San Antonio (1956-1969) and Bishop of San Angelo (1969-1979)
 Camillus Paul Maes (1846-1915), Bishop of Covington (1885-1915)
 Thomas Francis Maloney (1903-1962), sixth rector of the American College and Auxiliary Bishop of Providence (1960-1962)
 Russell Joseph McVinney (1898-1971), Bishop of Providence (1948-1971), influential in reopening the college in 1952
 Theophile Meerschaert (1847-1924), Bishop of Oklahoma (1891-1924)
 Robert Edward Mulvee (1930-2018), Bishop of Wilmington (1985-1995) and Bishop of Providence
 Henry Joseph O'Brien (1896-1976), Archbishop of Hartford (1945-1968)
 John Joseph O'Connor (1855-1927), Bishop of Newark (1901-1927)
 Bertram Orth, Bishop of Victoria (1900-1908)
 David Laurin Ricken (°1952), Coadjutor Bishop of Cheyenne (1999-2001), Bishop of Cheyenne (2001-2008), and Bishop of Green Bay (2008-present)
 Patrick William Riordan (1841-1914), Archbishop of San Francisco (1884-1914)
 Charles-Jean Seghers (1839-1886), Bishop of Vancouver Island (1873-1878, 1884-1886), Archbishop of Oregon City (1880-1884), and "Apostle of Alaska"
 John Lancaster Spalding (1840-1916), Bishop of Peoria (1877-1908) and co-founder of The Catholic University of America
 William Stang (1854-1907), Bishop of Fall River (1904-1907)
 Augustine Van de Vyver (1844-1911), Bishop of Richmond (1889-1911)
 Edward Weisenburger (°1960), Bishop of Salina (2012–2017) and Bishop of Tucson (2017–present)
 Alexander Mieceslaus Zaleski (1906-1975), Bishop of Lansing (1965-1975)

See also
 List of colleges of Leuven University

References

External links
 1917 Catholic Encyclopedia Entry on The American College
 St. Mary Basilica Archives
 USCCB Statement on the Closing of The American College of Louvain
 USCCB Statement on the Preservation of the Heritage of The American College of Louvain

Former Catholic seminaries
Buildings and structures in Flemish Brabant
Educational institutions established in 1857
Educational institutions disestablished in 2011
Education in Leuven
1857 establishments in Belgium